is a Japanese football player who currently plays for Fukushima United FC.

Career statistics
Updated to 23 February 2018.

References

External links
Profile at Fukushima United FC

1987 births
Living people
Kansai University alumni
Association football people from Osaka Prefecture
People from Moriguchi, Osaka
Japanese footballers
J1 League players
J2 League players
J3 League players
Tochigi SC players
Shonan Bellmare players
Montedio Yamagata players
Fukushima United FC players
Association football defenders